The spot-legged poison frog (Ameerega picta; formerly Epipedobates picta) is a species of dendrobatid frog found in Bolivia, Brazil, Peru, and Venezuela. Its habitat includes tropical and subtropical moist broadleaf forests, especially freshwater swamp forests.

References

Ameerega
Amphibians described in 1838
Taxonomy articles created by Polbot